Miss Earth South Africa is a beauty pageant in South Africa that began in 2001. The winner of the pageant represents her country at Miss Earth pageant.

History
The Miss Earth South Africa is a women's empowerment and a leadership development pageant that promotes social progress and environmental sustainability with the platform to create a sustainable difference in conserving and preserving wildlife and the environment. The competition includes environmental workshops, campaigns, and the candidate's community projects.

The pageant was founded by its Executive Director, Catherine Constantinides, a climate activist and human rights defender. Catherine competed at the International Miss Earth in the Philippines. The leadership programme is now run by sister duo Catherine and Ella Bella Elaine Constantinides. Ella Bella is the educational officer and director of the leadership programme to empower young South Africa women while educating children in schools and the community at large.

Titleholders
Color key

See also
Miss South Africa
Miss Earth
Miss Grand South Africa

References

External links
 Official website

 
South Africa
Recurring events established in 2001
2001 establishments in South Africa
Beauty pageants in South Africa